Save Your Kisses is the debut studio album by Danish singer Natasha Thomas, released on 5 July 2004 by Epic Records. The album had impact in some European countries and South America, particularly in Brazil, where the song "It's Over Now" became popular following its inclusion on the soundtrack to the telenovela Her Own Destiny. In Japan, the album was released in 2005 with a different cover art and a slightly altered track listing; in it, "Save Your Kisses for Me" was replaced with "Let Me Show You (The Way)", which has the same arrangement, but with different lyrics, and the song "I'm Just a Little Bit Shy" was replaced with a single mix of "Save Your Kisses for Me".

Track listing

Personnel

Musicians
 Natasha Thomas – lead vocals ; background vocals 
 Alex Christensen – all instruments ; keyboards 
 Peter Könemann – all instruments, keyboards 
 Steffen Häfelinger – all instruments ; keyboards, guitars 
 Jens Klein – all instruments, keyboards 
 Jürgen Leydel – guitars 
 Daniel Davidsen – guitar 
 Linda Holmberg – background vocals 
 Thomas Sardorf – background vocals 
 Susanne Palsbøll – background vocals

Technical
 Alex Christensen – production, mixing ; executive production
 Andrew Nightline – executive production
 Steffen Häfelinger – mixing ; editing ; vocal editing 
 Le Koma – mixing ; vocal editing 
 Mr. Minimal – mixing ; vocal editing 
 WCA – production 
 Peter Mark – mixing

Artwork
 Thomas Leidig – photography
 Joaquim Justo – photography
 Markus Nass – photography
 Marc Schilkowski – artwork

Charts

Release history

References

2004 debut albums
Epic Records albums
Natasha Thomas albums